Daniel Robert Fraser (August 26, 1851 – January 12, 1920) was a politician in Alberta, Canada and a municipal alderman in Edmonton.

Biography
Daniel Fraser was born in Edinburgh, Scotland and emigrated to New York and then Canada as a child.  He was educated in Huron County, Ontario.  He apprenticed as a millwright, joiner, and carpenter before moving to Manitoba in 1874 to work for the Hudson's Bay Company and later McCauley & Jarvis.  In 1880 he returned to the Hudson's Bay Company, for whom he built a saw and flour mill in Edmonton and a flour mill in Prince Albert, Saskatchewan.  He finally settled in Edmonton in 1881 and operated his own mill under the name D R Fraser & Company Limited before becoming President of Alberta Milling Co., which operated four flour mills, and later Edmonton Pressed Brick Co.  He married Jane McCann in 1891; the couple had four children.

In 1892, Fraser was elected as an alderman to Edmonton's inaugural Town Council, finishing second of fourteen candidates (the top six were elected).  However, he was defeated in his 1893 re-election bid, finishing last of nine candidates.  He stayed out of politics until 1896, when he squeaked back into office by finishing sixth of nine candidates (three votes ahead of future mayor William Thomas Henry).  He did not seek re-election in 1898, and removed himself from politics once again until 1902, when he returned to office. finishing first in the aldermanic race.

Fraser sought re-election in 1904 (aldermanic terms had been increased to two years), the year of Edmonton's incorporation as a city rather than a town.  The number of aldermen was increased from six to eight.  In order to maintain the system of staggered two year aldermanic terms, it was decided that the four candidates receiving the most votes in the 1904 election would be elected to two year terms, while the four receiving the next highest number of votes would be elected to one year terms.  Fraser finished seventh of seventeen candidates, and was therefore elected to a one-year term.  He was defeated in his 1905 bid for re-election, finishing eighth of ten candidates.

At this point, Fraser took a third hiatus from politics, which lasted until 1908 when he ran again and finished sixth of thirteen candidates.  Since the electoral system at the time had four aldermen elected to two year terms each year, Fraser's sixth place showing would normally have been insufficient to be elected; however, two of the aldermen elected in 1907 (Robert Lee and Thomas Bellamy) had resigned, allowing Fraser and fifth-place finisher Andrew Agar to be elected for one year to serve out their terms.

Fraser did not seek re-election in 1909 and stayed out of politics thereafter.  He died in 1920.

References

Edmonton Public Library biography of Daniel Fraser
City of Edmonton biography of Daniel Fraser

1851 births
1920 deaths
Edmonton city councillors
Politicians from Edinburgh
Scottish emigrants to pre-Confederation Ontario
Immigrants to the Province of Canada
Immigrants to pre-Confederation Alberta